The East Branch North Fork Feather River is a left tributary of the North Fork Feather River in the northern Sierra Nevada, Plumas County, California. Primarily within the Plumas National Forest, its course extends from Paxton (north of Quincy) to Belden.

Course
The East Branch is formed by the confluence of Indian Creek and Spanish Creek just upstream of Paxton.

The river canyon is an important transportation corridor, forming route for SR 70, which parallels the north bank of the river, and for the Union Pacific Railroad's Feather River Route on the south bank. The Feather River Route was originally constructed between 1906 and 1909 while the highway was built in the 1920s.

There are several large alluvial valleys in the East Branch watershed. Indian Creek flows through Indian Valley, which includes the communities of Greenville and Taylorsville. Spanish Creek flows through the American Valley, which includes Quincy, the county seat of Plumas County. Settlers drained the valley's wet meadows for cattle and hay production, and its stream channels are deeply incised (beavers were nearly eliminated).

See also
List of rivers of California

References

External links
Plumas National Forest - Map

Tributaries of the Feather River
Rivers of Plumas County, California
Rivers of the Sierra Nevada (United States)
Feather Headwaters
Plumas National Forest
Rivers of Northern California
Rivers of the Sierra Nevada in California